Eber Brock Ward (December 25, 1811 – January 2, 1875) was an American industrialist, iron and steel manufacturer, and shipbuilder.  

Ward invested in several industries in Michigan and the Midwest. He started as an owner of steamship interests, and later accumulated woodlands, as well as lands that contained iron ore, copper and silver. His investments would ultimately include newspapers, railroads, glass manufacturing, banking, and insurance companies.

Early life 

Ward was born in Applegaths Mills, Waterloo County, Ontario, Canada, on December 25, 1811.

While in Waterford, Pennsylvania, Ward's mother fell ill and died and the family moved to Detroit.

Business

Shipping 
Ward obtained a job as a cabin boy and deck hand when he was twelve or thirteen years old at Marine City, Michigan and worked for a time for Samuel Ward, his uncle. Ward came in contact with marine transactions this way, and learned the industry.

Ward invested in a vessel called the General Harrison, as a 25 percent owner, and became the master of this vessel in 1835. He was successful as its operator, but eventually became a partner with his uncle at Marine City. He was successful at this enterprise, and continued this until 1850, when he moved to Detroit. There he was involved in the shipbuilding business, and his operations participated in the construction of steamers and sailing ships; among them were the Arctic, Atlantic, B.F. Wade, Detroit, General Harrison, Huron, Montgomery, Ocean, Pacific, Planet, Samuel Ward, Caspian, Champion, and Pearl.

Railroading 
Starting around 1852, Ward acquired timberlands along the Pere Marquette River in Lake County, near the Ludington area. He held onto this land, waiting for the timber to mature. He was elected president of the Flint and Pere Marquette Railroad Company in 1860, and was the first to use rail made of Bessemer steel.

Steel manufacturing 

Bessemer steel was produced at Kelly Pneumatic Process Company around 1864 or 1865.

Logging 
Ward carried on logging operations in Lake County through his agents.

Ward built a sawmill out on Lake Pere Marquette in 1870, known as the "North" mill. It was equipped with two circular mills, and "cutting-edge technology". Ward purchased all the land between his mill and that of Messrs. Danaher and Melendy, which bordered on the Lake in the spring of 1871. This was used for storing supplies, and selling supplies to his employees. The next year Ward, built another mill nearby, which was called the "South" mill. This was then considered the best sawmill in the United States.

Mining 
Ward engaged in silver mining around Lake Superior with the Silver Islet Mining Company.

Personal life 

Ward was married twice. His first marriage, on July 24, 1837, was to Mary Margaret McQueen of Newport, Michigan, who had seven children that grew to adulthood. His second marriage, in 1869 , was to Catherine Lyon of Conneaut, Ohio.

Ward died of a stroke on January 2, 1875. He owned about a million dollars worth' of stock in the Chicago Rolling Mill company, and about half a million dollars' worth of stock of the Milwaukee Rolling Mill company. He also had about a half a million in the Wyandotte Rolling Mill. He left seven children. He last lived at West Fort Street and 19th Ave in Detroit. Ward is buried in Elmwood Cemetery.

References

Bibliography

Further reading

External links 
Michigan Pioneer and Historical Collections

1811 births
1875 deaths
Burials at Elmwood Cemetery (Detroit)
Businesspeople from Detroit
Businesspeople from Ontario
People from the Regional Municipality of Waterloo
People from Marine City, Michigan
19th-century American businesspeople